The 1992 Croatian Football Super Cup was the first edition of the Croatian Football Super Cup, a football match contested by the winners of the previous season's Croatian First League and Croatian Football Cup competitions. The match was played on 18 July 1992 at Stadion Maksimir in Zagreb between the 1992 Croatian First League winners Hajduk Split and 1992 Croatian Football Cup winners Inker Zaprešić. The 1992 Supercup was the first competition of its kind in Croatia because the Supercup was never organised by the former Football Association of Yugoslavia.

Match details

References 

 1992 Croatian Football Super Cup at HRnogomet.com

1992
HNK Hajduk Split matches
Supercup
Croatian Football Super Cup 1992